Victor Schelstraete is a Belgian boxer. He participated at the 2021 AIBA World Boxing Championships, being awarded the bronze medal in the cruiserweight event. Schelstraete was the first and only person of his country to win a medal.

References

External links 

Living people
Year of birth missing (living people)
Place of birth missing (living people)
Belgian male boxers
Cruiserweight boxers
AIBA World Boxing Championships medalists